The U.S. Post Office-Lihue, also known as Lihue Post Office, in Lihue, Hawaii, was built in 1939.  It was listed on the National Register of Historic Places in 1989.

The Mission Revival style architecture of the building is an accommodation to local citizens who did not want the standard neo-classical design of many mainland U.S. post offices.

See also 
List of United States post offices

References 

Government buildings completed in 1939
Post office buildings in Hawaii
Buildings and structures in Kauai County, Hawaii
Post office buildings on the National Register of Historic Places in Hawaii
Mission Revival architecture in Hawaii
1939 establishments in Hawaii